Kill Trend Suicide is a mini-album by grindcore band Brutal Truth. It was labelled as a "mini-album" due to it being longer than an EP but not as long as a standard album. This release shows a shift from the grindcore sound that the band had previously played, by incorporating elements of crust punk, rock, and experimental music. Riffs that sound similar to that of Frank Zappa can also be found on this mini-album, most prominent being on the song "Zombie".

Track listing

References

1996 albums
Brutal Truth albums
Relapse Records albums